Coolabine is a rural locality in the Sunshine Coast Region, Queensland, Australia. In the  Coolabine had a population of 71 people.

Geography 
Coolabine is a  locality in a valley (approx 100 metres above sea level) surrounded by mountains to the north, east and south, a range that includes Mount Thilba Thalba (450 metres in neighbouring Gheerulla) and Connors Knob (420 metres in neighbouring Obi Obi). It is locality is bounded on its west by Obi Obi Creek. Cooloobun Creek rises in the mountains to the south and then flows through the locality from east to west, joining Obi Obi Creek.

The land is freehold and rural residential in character.

History 
The name Coolabine is an Aboriginal word meaning "place of koalas".

Coolabine State School opened about 1928 and closed about 1956.

In the  Coolabine had a population of 71 people.

References 

Suburbs of the Sunshine Coast Region
Localities in Queensland